Paul Berthier (1884–1953) was the co-founder of Manécanterie des Petits Chanteurs à la Croix de Bois in 1906.  He wrote a doctoral thesis on the legal protection of composers which has long been authoritative and an essay on Jean-Philippe Rameau.  He was the grandfather of the singer France Gall, father of the composer and organist Jacques Berthier (1923–1994) and great-grandfather of French producer, Raphael Hamburger.

He was the organist at Auxerre Cathedral until 1953.  He composed the famous Christmas lullaby Dors ma colombe.

External links 
 

1884 births
1953 deaths
People from Auxerre
French classical organists
French male organists
20th-century French composers
French classical composers
French male classical composers
20th-century organists
20th-century French male musicians
Male classical organists